Shondham 16 is a 1989 Indian Tamil-language film written, directed and co-produced by T. S. Krishna Kumar. The film stars Mohan and debutante Kalyani.

Plot 

It is the story of an orphan played by Mohan attempting to get married to the girl he is in love with. Challenges crop up when his would-be father-in-law has a condition that the groom should have a large joint family. Desperate to marry her, he lies he has sixteen relatives who live with him and sets his office colleagues up as his relatives.

However, upon seeing that all his relatives depend on him for everything, the father-in-law changes his mind deciding that all relatives are self-serving. In the end, when they all donate blood to save Mohan's life, he understands the truth and the marriage is solemnized.

Cast 
 Mohan
 Kalyani
 Chandrasekhar
 Manorama
 S. S. Chandran
 Senthil
 Kovai Sarala
 Disco Shanti
 Lalitha Kumari

Production 
Shondham 16 was directed by T. S. Krishna Kumar, and produced by him and Malarkodi Dorairaj under Sri Durga Films. Krishna Kumar also wrote the screenplay, while T. Dorairaj wrote the story and dialogues. Cinematography was handled by Babu, and editing by Srinivas Krishna. This is the debut film of Kalyani. It was also a rare Tamil film in which Mohan dubbed in his own voice.

Soundtrack 
The music was composed by Shankar–Ganesh, and the lyrics were written by Vaalee.

Release 
P. S. S. of Kalki likened the film to a stage play.

References

External links 
 

1980s Tamil-language films
1989 films
Films scored by Shankar–Ganesh